James Payne may refer to:

James Payne (cricketer), English cricketer
James Spriggs Payne (1819–1882), President of Liberia
James Dennis Payne (1896–1987), World War I aviator
James W. Payne (1929–1992), American set decorator
James H. Payne (born 1941), American judge
James Arthur Payne (1884–1968), American fly rod maker, designer and business owner
James L. Payne, American social scientist

See also

Jim Payne (disambiguation)
Jimmy Payne (1926–2013), English footballer
James Payn (1830–1898), English novelist
James Paine (disambiguation)